Show-Ya Twin Best is a double CD compilation of songs by the Japanese hard rock band Show-Ya. The compilation was released in 1996 in Japan and refers mainly to songs from the first five albums of the band.

Track listing

CD 1
"Mizu no Naka no Toubousha" (水の中の逃亡者) – 3:59
"Kodoku no Meiro (Labyrinth)" (孤独の迷路（ラビリンス）) – 4:52
"One Way Heart" – 4:18
"Shidokenaku Emotion" (しどけなくエモーション) – 4:10
"Sono Ato De Koroshitai" (その後で殺したい) – 4:11
"Genkai Lovers" (限界 Lovers) – 3:59
"Au Revoir (Last Scene)"  - 5:21
"Watashi Wa Arashi" (私は嵐) – 4:05
"Actor" – 4:41
"Talon of King" (ターロン・オブ・キング（爪王）) – 4:46
"Silent Vision" (サイレント　ヴィジョン) – 5:13
"Fairy" – 3:56
"Everybody Someday" – 5:37

CD 2
"Chikasuidou no Tsuki" (地下水道の月) – 7:26
"Thermostat no Hitomi" (サーモスタットの瞳) – 5:59
"Ame no Knife" (雨のナイフ) – 4:20
"3 Dome no Christmas" (3度目のクリスマス) – 4:34
"Hurry Up" – 4:14
"Masquerade" – 4:05
"Mr. J" – 3:35
"Toki Wo Koete" (時を越えて) – 5:52
"Blow Away" – 4:28
"S・T・O・P (But I Can't...)" – 4:05
"Yoru Ga Kuru Made Nemuretai" (夜が来るまで眠りたい) – 4:29
"Uso Da To Itte Yo, Moon Light" (嘘だと言ってよ Moon Light) – 4:45
"Sakebi" (叫び) – 4:27
"Touch Me" – 3:12
"Mind Collection" – 4:47
"Visconti no Shouzou" (ヴィスコンティの肖像) – 3:51
"Over Now" – 4:48

Personnel

Band Members
Keiko Terada - Vocals
Miki Igarashi - Guitars
Miki Nakamura - Keyboards
Satomi Senba - Bass
Miki Tsunoda - Drums

References

Show-Ya albums
1996 compilation albums
EMI Records compilation albums
Japanese-language compilation albums